Manohar Kant Dhyani (born 7 July 1942), is a Bharatiya Janata Party politician and a former member of the Rajya Sabha from Uttarakhand, in northern India.

References

1942 births
Living people
People from Rishikesh
People from Pauri Garhwal district
Bharatiya Janata Party politicians from Uttarakhand
Rajya Sabha members from Uttarakhand
Rajya Sabha members from the Bharatiya Janata Party